Sirur  is a village in the southern state of Karnataka, India. It is located in the Bagalkot taluk of Bagalkot district in Karnataka.

Demographics
 India census, Sirur had a population of 11163 with 5660 males and 5503 females.

See also
 Bagalkot
 Districts of Karnataka

References

External links
 http://Bagalkot.nic.in/

Villages in Bagalkot district